Dil To Pagal Hai is a 1997 Indian Hindi-language musical romantic film that was co-written, directed, and co-produced by Yash Chopra. It stars Shah Rukh Khan as the choreographer Rahul, and Madhuri Dixit and Karisma Kapoor as the dancers Pooja and Nisha, respectively. The film is about the three's lives as members of a musical troupe, and follows the competition between Pooja and Nisha for Rahul's love. The soundtrack of the film was composed by Uttam Singh, while the lyrics were written by Anand Bakshi. The film was shot by Manmohan Singh on the sets designed by Sharmishta Roy, and was edited by V. Karnik.

Film reviewers however received it with a mixed-to-negative reception, criticising its writing while praising the actors' performances and its songs. The film received 23 awards out of 49 nominations; the direction, performances of the cast, music, choreography, and art direction met with the most attention from various award groups.

Dil To Pagal Hai won three trophies at the 45th National Film Awards, including Best Popular Film Providing Wholesome Entertainment and Best Supporting Actress (Kapoor). At the 43rd Filmfare Awards, the film fetched a total of seven awards, including Best Film, Best Actor (Khan), Best Actress (Dixit), and Best Supporting Actress (Kapoor), out of eleven nominations, including Best Director (Chopra) and Best Supporting Actor (Akshay Kumar). At the 4th Screen Awards, it was nominated for eight categories, which include those for Best Actor (Khan) and Best Supporting Actress (Kapoor), and had two wins. The film also received ten awards at the 1st Zee Cine Awards, including Best Film, Best Actor – Male (Khan), Best Actor – Female (Dixit), and Best Actor in a Supporting Role – Female (Kapoor).

Awards and nominations

Notes

References

External links 
 Awards and nominations received by Koi... Mil Gaya at IMDb

Dil To Pagal Hai